Circumstantial Evidence is a 1929 American crime film directed by Wilfred Noy and starring Cornelius Keefe, Helen Foster, and Alice Lake.

Cast
Cornelius Keefe as Arthur Rowland 
Helen Foster as Jean Benton  
Alice Lake as Lucy Bishop  
Charles K. Gerrard as Henry Lord  
Ray Hallor as Tony Benton  
Fred Walton as Judge  
Jack Tanner as Prosecuting Attorney

References

External links

1929 crime films
American crime films
Films directed by Wilfred Noy
American silent feature films
Chesterfield Pictures films
American black-and-white films
1920s American films